John Isner was the two-time defending champion and had won the title five times in the last six years, but he lost in the second round to Reilly Opelka. This was only the second time out of ten in the Atlanta Open's history that Isner failed to reach the singles final.

Alex de Minaur won the title, defeating Taylor Fritz in the final, 6–3, 7–6(7–2).

Seeds
The top four seeds received a bye into the second round.

Draw

Finals

Top half

Bottom half

Qualifying

Seeds

Qualifiers

Qualifying draw

First qualifier

Second qualifier

Third qualifier

Fourth qualifier

References

External links
Main draw
Qualifying draw

Atlanta Open - Singles
2019 ATP Tour
2019 Singles
Atlanta